The Japanese resident-general of Korea was the leader of Korea under Japanese rule from 1905 to 1910. This post was highly hated among native Koreans, and international opinion regarded it as nothing more than an imperial sanction to ward off the imperial interests of China, Russia, and the Western Powers (collectively: Britain, France, and the United States).

List of Japanese residents-general

See also 
 Governor-General of Korea
 Governor-General of Taiwan

References